An All-American team is an honorary sports team composed of the best amateur players of a specific season for each position—who in turn are given the honorific "All-America" and typically referred to as "All-American athletes", or simply "All-Americans".  Although the honorees generally do not compete as a unit, the term is used in U.S. team sports to refer to players who are selected by members of the national media.  Walter Camp selected the first All-America team in the early days of American football in 1889.  In 1950, the American Baseball Coaches Association (ABCA) selected its first All-American baseball team.  It has since chosen All-American teams and a player of the year for each division (National Collegiate Athletic Association (NCAA) Division I, Division II, Division III, National Association of Intercollegiate Athletics, junior college and high school).  Collegiate Baseball selects All-American, Freshman All-American and High School All-American teams.  Baseball America magazine selects pre-season and post-season All-American teams and College Player of the Year honorees.

Various organizations selected All-American lists of the best players for the 1993 NCAA Division I college baseball season. The ABCA, the magazine Baseball America, and Collegiate Baseball were the NCAA-sanctioned selectors.  This list only includes players selected to the post-season All-American first team for each selector.  However, many All-American selections choose second, third, etc. teams from the remaining eligible candidates.

Accomplishments
The 1993 All-American class featured three Major League Baseball All-Stars, one Major League Baseball record holder and three World Series champions.   Jason Varitek remained active. A total of eight players were selected by all three NCAA-sanctioned selectors: pitchers Dan Choi, and Brian Anderson; catcher Varitek; first baseman Ryan McGuire; second baseman Todd Walker; shortstop Mark Loretta; outfielders Eric Danapilis and Brooks Kieschnick.

Kieschnick was both a 1991 and 1992 selection. He won the 1992 & 1993 Dick Howser Trophy, while Varitek won it in 1994. Varitek was honored by all three selectors in 1992 and 1994 and was player of the year in 1994. Walker, who won the 1993 College World Series Most Outstanding Player, was selected by all three organizations in 1994.  Darren Dreifort repeated as a selection from the 1992 team. He won the 1993 Rotary Smith Award and the 1993 Golden Spikes Award, and Varitek won both awards in 1994. Both Arizona State and Texas A&M had two players included on the team.

Walker led the National League second basemen in fielding percentage and putouts during the 2002 Major League Baseball season. Loretta was selected for the 2004 MLB All-Star Game.  During the 2004 season he led the National League in sacrifice flies and led National League second basemen in assists. Loretta was later selected to the 2006 MLB All-Star Game. During the 2000 season he led National League shortstops in fielding percentage. He accumulated over 1700 career hits and won a Silver Slugger in 2004. Varitek is a three-time MLB All-Star (2003, 2005 & 2008), Gold Glove-winner, Silver Slugger-winner and two-time World Series champion (2004 & 2007). He has called the pitches for a major league record four no-hitters.  Paul Lo Duca had the most All-Star game selections of players in the 1993 All-America class with four (2003, 2004, 2005 & 2006).  In 2002 and 2003, he led National League catchers in putouts, assists and runners caught stealing.  However, in 2004 and 2005 he allowed the most stolen bases and in 2003, 2005 and 2006, he committed the most errors among catchers.  In 1998, Brian Anderson led the National League with the fewest bases on balls per 9 innings pitched (1.039), but surrendered the most home runs (39).  That season, he was a member of the inaugural Arizona Diamondbacks roster.  He was also a member of the Diamondbacks' 2001 World Series Championship team along with 1993 All-American Troy Brohawn.

Key

All-Americans
Below are the Division I players selected to the various NCAA-sanctioned lists. The default list order is arranged by the position numbers used by official baseball scorekeepers (i.e., etc.).

See also
Baseball awards#U.S. college baseball

References
General

Inline citations

College Baseball All-America Teams
All-America